Bijar Protected Area is in northeastern Kurdistan province, 15 kilometers from Bijar city.

References

Bijar County
Protected areas of Iran
Geography of Kurdistan Province